Abdollah-e Amuri (also Romanized as ‘Abdollāh-e ‘Amūrī; also known as Shāveh-ye ‘Abdollāh-e Āmūrī) is a village in Moshrageh Rural District, Moshrageh District, Ramshir County, Khuzestan Province, Iran. At the 2006 census, its population was 687, in 122 families.

References 

Populated places in Ramshir County